Adeliini may refer to:
Adeliini (beetle), a tribe of beetles in the family Tenebrionidae
Adeliini (wasp), a tribe of wasps in the family Braconidae